Patrie (French "fatherland") or La Patrie (The fatherland) may refer to:

Patrie
Patrie!, 1869 play by Victorien Sardou about the rising of the Dutch Geuzen at the end of the 16th century
Patrie!, a popular 1886 opera by Paladihle based on the play 
Patrie (1917 film), based on the play
Patrie (1946 film), also based on the play
Patrie (airship), 1906
French battleship Patrie, launched in 1903

La Patrie
La Patrie, Quebec, a municipality of about 750 people in Le Haut-Saint-François Regional County Municipality, in Quebec, Canada.
La Patrie (Canadian newspaper), Montreal newspaper 1879-1978
La Patrie (French newspaper), Parisian financial newspaper 1841